Colonel Sir Thomas Noel Hill KCB KTS (24February, 17848January, 1832) was a British Army officer of the Napoleonic Wars who fought at the Battle of Waterloo on 18June, 1815.

Life and career
Born at Hawkstone Hall, near Hodnet, Shropshire, Hill was the seventh son of Sir John Hill, 3rd Baronet. He was brother to Robert, Clement and Rowland, who would go on to become Commander-in-Chief of the British Army.

Educated at Shrewsbury School, he then entered the army on 25September 1801, at the age of seventeen, as a cornet in the 10th (Prince of Wales's Own) Regiment of (Light) Dragoons (Hussars) and purchased a lieutenancy the following year. In 1806, by now a captain, he exchanged to the 53rd Regiment of Foot and served as aide-de-camp to his brother Rowland in England and Ireland before accompanying him to Portugal in 1808.

Hill was present at the subsequent battles of Roleia and Vimeiro, as well as during the retreat of Sir John Moore's army following the Battle of Corunna.

When the Portuguese Army was created in 1809 under Lieutenant-General William Beresford, Hill was appointed to the command of the 1st Portuguese Regiment, with the rank of Lieutenant-Colonel, and made brevet Major in the British Army at the same time. Together with the Portuguese 16th (Vieira Telles) Regiment and the 4th Regiment of Caçadores, Hill's unit completed the 1st Independent Brigade under the command of Sir Denis Pack, which subsequently took part in the Battle of Busaco on 27September 1810. In 1811, Hill was promoted to the rank of lieutenant-colonel by brevet in the British army.

For his role in the Siege of Ciudad Rodrigo, Hill received an honorary distinction and he went on to fight in the battles of Salamanca (1812), Vittoria (1813) and the siege of San Sebastián (1813). Hill received a medal on each of those occasions. Having attained the rank of colonel in the Portuguese Army, he returned to England in 1814 having with permission received the Royal Portuguese Order of the Tower and Sword on March 11, 1813. In July that year he was promoted to a company in the 1st Foot Guards then in January 1815 he was created a Knight Commander of the Most Honourable Military Order of the Bath.

Hill was subsequently employed as an assistant in the Adjutant-General’s department, and for his services at the Battle of Waterloo received the Waterloo Medal and was nominated for a Knight's Cross of the Royal Bavarian Military Order of Max Joseph. He was promoted to Lieutenant-Colonel on the 25July 1814 and knighted on the 28th of the same month.

Back in England, he retired for a time on half-pay. In 1825, he was promoted to Colonel and in 1827, after applying to the then Commander-in-chief, the Duke of Wellington, he was appointed Deputy Adjutant-General in Canada.

Death
Having succeeded Sir John Brown as commander of the cavalry depot at Maidstone in Kent, he died in office on 8January 1832 aged 47 after a short illness. His body lay in state in the local barracks for a day before the funeral, the procession of which included lancers, dragoons of his old regiment, the 13th, a band playing the Dead March in Saul and a firing party numbering 150 men with rifles reversed. His brother Rowland acted as chief mourner while others in attendance included Lieutenant General James Kempt, Master-General of the Ordnance and Sir John Beresford the Commander-in-Chief, The Nore.

His widow, Anna Maria Shore, Lady Hill, daughter of John Shore, 1st Baron Teignmouth, died at her residence in Hampton Court Palace, Middlesex, on 25February 1886.

References

Bibliography
 
 
 
 
 

1784 births
1832 deaths
British Army personnel of the Napoleonic Wars
Grenadier Guards officers
Knights Grand Cross of the Order of the Bath
Recipients of the Order of the Tower and Sword
Military personnel from Shropshire
Recipients of the Waterloo Medal